Flooxer is a Spanish brand of original audiovisual streaming content which belongs to Atresmedia. Initially its own platform, after the launch of streaming service Atresplayer by Atresmedia, the brand and content from Flooxer were integrated into the new platform.

In July 2016, the streaming television series Paquita Salas, created by Javier Ambrossi and Javier Calvo, was premiered on Flooxer. Due to the success of the series, Netflix acquired the rights to air the second season. The series won the Premios Feroz for Best Comedy Series.

In 2019, Flooxer released the documentary film Vosotros sois mi película, directed by Carlo Padial and starring Wismichu.

References

External links
 

Atresmedia Televisión